South of Heaven  is a 2021 American crime film directed by Aharon Keshales and starring Jason Sudeikis and Evangeline Lilly.

It was released on October 8, 2021, by RLJE Films.

Plot
A paroled convict after a long prison term attempts to give a dying childhood sweetheart a wonderful final year.

Cast
 Jason Sudeikis as Jimmy Ray
 Evangeline Lilly as Annie Ray
 Mike Colter as Whit Price
 Shea Whigham as Officer Schmidt
 Jeremy Bobb as Frank
 Thaddeus J. Mixon as Tommy Price
 Michael Paré as Joey
 Amaury Nolasco as Manny
 Jaime Zevallos as Julio
 Greg Hill as Sam
 Rupert Reyes as Priest
 Tina Parker as Parole Panel Woman

Production
In November 2019, it was announced Jason Sudeikis and Evangeline Lilly had joined the cast of the film, with Aharon Keshales directing from a screenplay by Keshales, Navot Papushado and Kai Mark. In January 2020, it was announced Mike Colter, Shea Whigham, Jeremy Bobb, Michael Paré and Amaury Nolasco had joined the cast of the film.

Filming occurred in Texas in March 2020.

Release
It was released on October 8, 2021, by RLJE Films.

Reception

Accolades

References

External links
 

American crime drama films
American crime thriller films
American thriller drama films
Films shot in Texas
2021 crime drama films
2021 crime thriller films
2021 thriller drama films
2020s English-language films
2020s American films